The 2014 FC Taraz season was the 6th successive season that the club playing in the Kazakhstan Premier League, the highest tier of association football in Kazakhstan. Taraz finished the season in 11th position, beating FC Kyran on penalties in a relegation play-off whilst also reaching the quarter-finals of the Kazakhstan Cup, where they lost to Aktobe.

Squad

Transfers

Winter

In:

Out:

Summer

In:

Out:

Competitions

Kazakhstan Premier League

First round

Results summary

Results

League table

Relegation round

Results summary

Results

Table

Relegation play-off

Kazakhstan Cup

Squad statistics

Appearances and goals

|-
|colspan="14"|Players who appeared for Taraz that left during the season:

|}

Goal scorers

Disciplinary record

References

External links
 Official Site

Taraz
FC Taraz seasons